The Alberta Debate And Speech Association (ADSA) is the association in charge of competitive debate at the junior high and high school levels in Alberta.

History 

The ADSA was formed in 1974 to promote and organise debate events in the province of Alberta.

Purpose 

The association is responsible for administrating debate in Alberta. In practice, this includes such things as: organising tournaments, regional and provincial tournaments, and other events, including law day. Also, the ADSA is responsible for organising the Alberta entrants for the Canadian national debate tournament.

Language
For the most part, ADSA tournaments are conducted in English, although other bilingual tournaments are held throughout the year. However, regional, provincial and national competition can be done either in the English or bilingual (English and French) categories.

See also
Debate
Alberta

References

External links
 Alberta Debate and Speech Association

Organizations based in Edmonton